A crash course is an educational or research course conducted over a very short period of time. These rapid learning programs may also be described by the ambiguous term crash program.

Crash Course may also refer to:

Television and movies
 Crash Course (film), a 1988 made-for-television film directed by Oz Scott
 Crash Course (game show), a 2009 game show
 Crash Course (YouTube), a 2012 educational program launched by John and Hank Green
 Richard Hammond's Crash Course, a 2012 BBC America television show
 "Crash Course", the 72nd episode of Code Lyoko

Other uses
 Crash Course, a campaign in the video game Left 4 Dead
 Doritos Crash Course, a 2010 Xbox Live Arcade video game
 Crash Course in Science, a post punk band formed in 1979 in Philadelphia

See also
 Crash program, a plan of action entailing rapid, intensive resource allocation to solve a pressing problem